The Boeing Vertol BV-347 (also known as the Model 347) is an experimental helicopter built by Boeing Vertol from a converted CH-47A Chinook.

Design and development 
Development of the BV-347 began in January 1969, when Boeing Vertol was contracted by the United States Army to develop an improved CH-47 Chinook. The Army loaned a single CH-47A, serial number 65-7992, to be modified in exchange for exclusive rights to the project's research data. The modifications, which were funded by Boeing, were carried out in two phases. Phase I began with redesigned rotors, which had four blades of increased diameter compared to the Chinook's three-blade rotors, as well as a 30-degree offset flapping hinge. The rear pylon was raised  to increase rotor clearance and decrease noise. The engines were replaced with uprated T55-L-11s, which would later be standard on the CH-47C. The cockpit layout was improved, with thicker glass being added, as well as a bulkhead with an entrance door and other improvements to reduce cockpit noise.

For Phase II, a pair of small wings was added to the fuselage.  These wings served to provide extra lift and allowed the BV-347 to achieve a 60 degree banked turn.  They had a variable incidence from 10 degrees down to 85 degrees up, and featured full-span flaps.  During hover, the wings would be tilted to 85 degrees to minimize interference with the rotor downwash.

Operational history 

The BV-347 made its first flight in Phase I configuration on May 27, 1970. Flight testing of the Phase II configuration began in December 1971.

Boeing Vertol used the BV-347 as part of the development of the XCH-62.  As part of the program, the BV-347's hydro-mechanical rotor control system was replaced with a fly-by-wire system, becoming the first helicopter in history to be controlled with such a system.  The BV-347 was also fitted with a retractable ventral gondola, with its own set of controls, which was used to operate the load recovery system.  A sidearm controller originally developed for the XCH-62 was installed in the gondola.  The new control system was noted to be easy for novice pilots to fly.  During demonstrations in Washington DC, the BV-347 was flown by over 125 pilots, 100 of which had never flown an aircraft of any kind before, with some even being capable of performing normally difficult maneuvers.

Flight testing of the BV-347 was completed in 1975.  Although the Army could not feasibly upgrade its entire CH-47 fleet with the stretched fuselage and wings of the BV-347, the latter did influence some of the improvements made to the CH-47D, such as the flight control systems and reliability improvements.

Variants 
BV-347 Phase I
Original configuration with stretched fuselage.

BV-347 Phase II
Fitted with small wings on the mid fuselage.

Civil BV-347
A civil variant of the BV-347 considered by NASA.

Aircraft on display 
Following the completion of the test program, the sole BV-347 was retired and donated to the United States Army Aviation Museum at Fort Rucker, Alabama.

Specifications (BV-347, Phase II)

See also

References

External links 

 BV-347 Phase II final report

Boeing military aircraft
Aircraft first flown in 1970
Tandem rotor helicopters
1970s United States helicopters
Twin-turbine helicopters